Parathyreinae is a subfamily of fossil beetles in the family Buprestidae, containing the following genera and species:

 Genus Acmaeoderimorpha Alexeev, 1993
 Acmaeoderimorpha emersa Alexeev, 1996
 Acmaeoderimorpha ignota Alexeev, 1993
 Genus Ancestrimorpha Alexeev, 1993
 Ancestrimorpha volgensis Alexeev, 1993
 Genus Cretocrassisoma Alexeev, 2000
 Cretocrassisoma indistinctum (Alexeev, 1993)
 Genus Cretoelegantella Alexeev, 2000
 Cretoelegantella ponomarenkoi (Alexeev, 1993)
 Genus Dicercoptera Alexeev, 1993
 Dicercoptera longipennis Alexeev, 1993
 Genus Karatausia Alexeev, 1993
 Karatausia maculata Alexeev, 1993
 Genus Mongoligena Alexeev, 1993
 Mongoligena curta Alexeev, 1993
 Mongoligena popovi Alexeev, 1993
 Mongoligena vulgata Alexeev, 1993
 Genus Mongolobuprestis Alexeev, 1993
 Mongolobuprestis gratiosus Alexeev, 1993
 Genus Paleas Alexeev, 1993
 Paleas maculipennis Alexeev, 1993
 Genus Paramongoligena Alexeev, 1993
 Paramongoligena transversicollis Alexeev, 1993
 Genus Parathyrea Alexeev, 1993
 Parathyrea jurassica Alexeev, 1993
 Genus Pseudochrysobothris Alexeev, 1993
 Pseudochrysobothris ballae (Whalley & Jarzembowski, 1985)
 Genus Pseudomongoligena Alexeev, 2000
 Pseudomongoligena schinkudukense Alexeev, 2000
 Genus Stigmoderimorpha Alexeev, 1993
 Stigmoderimorpha rasnitsyni Alexeev, 1993
 Genus Umerata Alexeev, 1993
 Umerata mirabilis Alexeev, 1993

References

Beetle subfamilies